Phellodon nothofagi is a species of tooth fungus in the family Bankeraceae. Found in New Zealand, it was described as new to science in 1971 by mycologist Robert Francis Ross McNabb.

References

External links

Fungi described in 1971
Fungi of New Zealand
Inedible fungi
nothofagi